Pitfall II: Lost Caverns is a platform game originally released for the Atari 2600 by Activision in 1984. It is the sequel to Pitfall! (1982). Both games were designed and programmed by David Crane and star jungle explorer Pitfall Harry. Pitfall II adds a much larger world with vertical scrolling, swimmable rivers with deadly eels, music, and balloons for floating between locations.

Published after the video game crash of 1983 when interest in the 2600 was waning, Pitfall II was one of the last major releases for the console and one of the most technically impressive. The cartridge contains a custom "Display Processor Chip," designed by Crane, for improved visuals and four-channel music instead of the two the system is normally capable of.

Pitfall II was ported to the Atari 5200, ColecoVision, TRS-80 Color Computer, Apple II, Atari 8-bit family, MSX, Commodore 64, and the IBM PCjr (as a cartridge). In 1985, Sega released an arcade remake of Pitfall II with a new visual style and gameplay elements from both the original and sequel. It was ported to the SG-1000 console in Japan. The game's plot was loosely remade into Super Pitfall for the Famicom/NES.

Gameplay
In Pitfall!, Pitfall Harry avoids crocodiles, scorpions, cobras, bats and quicksand across a series of horizontal screens. Lost Caverns dramatically expands the scope of the environment, as Harry descends into a deep, vertically scrolling underground. Unlike the first game, Harry has unlimited time and lives, making it impossible to die or lose. When Harry touches a dangerous creature, he loses points as he moves back to the last continue point (marked with a red cross) he touched along his journey.

Pitfall II has 27 horizontal levels. These levels span eight screens in width but are not openly accessible all the way across; some portions are blocked by cave walls that force Harry to travel through other areas in order to progress. Quicksand and tar pits are replaced by rivers and chasms. Balloons let Harry ascend to new areas.

Two characters debut in Lost Caverns: Quickclaw, Harry's cowardly pet mountain lion, and Rhonda, his adventure-seeking niece. Both characters were created for the Saturday Supercade cartoon based on Pitfall! a year before this game was released. Upon collecting Rhonda, Quickclaw, and a diamond ring, the game ends. Optional items can be collected for points. The maximum possible score is 199,000.

Musical cues act as subtle rewards and punishments for performance. The main theme plays for a short while before reaching a loop of acoustic music. When Harry collects a treasure, the main theme begins again. When Harry returns to a continue point, a slower, minor key version of the theme plays. If Harry ascends using the balloon, Sobre las Olas ("Over the Waves") is played.

Ports

The Atari 5200 and Atari 8-bit computer versions, called the Adventurer's Edition on their title screens, contain additional content. Programmer Mike Lorenzen reused David Crane's code from the 2600 version and added an entirely new level to the game, which was playable after the initial game was finished. Marketing would not allow the two versions to be different so the new level was relegated to an easter egg.

Reception
Computer and Video Games magazine rated the ColecoVision version 81% in 1989. Pitfall II: Lost Caverns was named No. 1 in the "best 25 Atari 2600 games of all time" in issue 46 of Retro Gamer magazine. Gamasutra included it as an open world game in their Game Design Essentials series.

In Japan, Game Machine listed the Sega arcade remake of Pitfall II: Lost Caverns on their March 1, 1985 issue as being the most successful table arcade unit of the month. Computer and Video Games reviewed Sega's arcade remake of Pitfall II, stating it is "an amalgamation of" Pitfall I and II that is "as good as, if not better than," the original games.

References

External links
 Pitfall II: Lost Caverns for the Atari 2600 at Atari Mania
 
 
 
 David Crane explains how the DPC sound chip works

1984 video games
Activision games
Apple II games
Arcade video games
Atari 2600 games
Atari 5200 games
Atari 8-bit family games
ColecoVision games
Commodore 64 games
MSX games
Open-world video games
Pitfall (series)
SG-1000 games
Sega System 1 games
TRS-80 Color Computer games
Video game sequels
Video games set in forests
ZX Spectrum games
Video games developed in the United States